The Elgar Society was founded in 1951 to promote performance of the music of British composer Edward Elgar, especially the more rarely performed items. Registered as a charity on 22 January 1988, It is particularly concerned with introducing the composer and his music to younger audiences and, by making grants to appropriate educational activities, to enhance the quality of life of members of the public.  It also supports the Elgar Birthplace Museum with an annual grant with the objective of widening accessibility to the location and its contents and encouraging research.

In the 1980s the Society encouraged the making of recordings of works such as The Black Knight which remained unrecorded.

Organization
The current president of the Elgar society is Sir Mark Elder. Previous presidents were Sir Adrian Boult from 1951, Lord Menuhin from 1983 and Richard Hickox from 1999.

There are seven UK Branches organised geographically: Great Western, London, North West, Scotland, Southern, Thames Valley and West Midlands; and a branch in Vancouver, British Columbia, Canada.  The creation of a Branch is at the discretion of the Society’s Council and requires substantive evidence from a sufficiently large group of members that there is a reasonable assurance of viability.  Branches are required to report periodically to the Council on their activities and submit their annual accounts to the Treasurer.

The society publishes a journal—The Elgar Society Journal—three times a year of Elgar research, and is sold to educational institutions and the general public as well as being sent to members as part of their subscription benefit. There is also a thrice-yearly newsletter sent to members only.

Elgar Medal 
Before 2011, The Elgar Medal was awarded only to foreign scholars and musicians who publish or perform, and therefore promote, Elgar’s music abroad.  During a concert in Birmingham’s Symphony Hall on 11 December 2008, Steven Halls, Chairman of the Society, presented the medal to Sakari Oramo.  The remaining outstanding award, to Vladimir Ashkenazy, presented in 2010. However, in February 2011, the Elgar Medal was presented to Michael Kennedy, CBE, a renowned British journalist, writer, and music critic, for his major contribution to promoting the works of Elgar. 2019 - Anastasia Vedyakova, the first Russian musician was awarded by The Elgar Medal.

Recipients

References

External links 
 
 Elgar performance

Music organisations based in the United Kingdom
Arts organizations established in 1951
1951 establishments in the United Kingdom
Edward Elgar